The 1969 Omloop Het Volk was the 24th edition of the Omloop Het Volk cycle race and was held on 1 March 1969. The race started and finished in Ghent. The race was won by Roger De Vlaeminck.

General classification

References

1969
Omloop Het Nieuwsblad
Omloop Het Nieuwsblad